

News

January
1 - Andreas Küttel wins the second competition for the 2006-07 Four Hills Tournament after he led the pack when all jumpers finished their first jump and the competition was cancelled due to poor weather conditions with wind and rain.

Ski jumping World Cup

Four Hills Tournament

FIS Nordic World Ski Championships
, Location: Sapporo, Japan

References